The West Atchafalaya Floodway is a flood control structure of the Mississippi River and Tributaries Project located in the Lower Atchafalaya Basin in south-central Louisiana.

Atchafalaya Basin floodways
The Atchafalaya Basin system comprises three floodways. Two of these, the West Atchafalaya Floodway and the Morganza Floodway, are at the northern end. Farther downstream, floodwaters enter the Gulf of Mexico through the Atchafalaya River below Morgan City, Louisiana and the Wax Lake Outlet.

See also
Mississippi River floods
Bonnet Carré Spillway
Old River Control Structure

References

Mississippi River
Buildings and structures in St. Landry Parish, Louisiana
United States Army Corps of Engineers